Palepicorsia is a genus of moths of the family Crambidae. It contains only one species, Palepicorsia ustrinalis, which is found on Sardinia and in France, Spain and Portugal, as well as in Saudi Arabia, the United Arab Emirates, Yemen, Turkmenistan, Iran, Pakistan and North Africa, including Tunisia.

References

Natural History Museum Lepidoptera genus database

Crambidae genera
Pyraustinae
Insects of the Arabian Peninsula
Moths of Europe
Monotypic moth genera